Tomás Ares Pena, known as Xan das Bolas (30 October 1908 – 13 September 1977) was a Spanish comic actor active during the franquism with films including Botón de ancla (1961).

Filmography

Films

TV series

References

External links
 

1908 births
1977 deaths
Spanish male film actors
Spanish male television actors
Male actors from Galicia (Spain)
20th-century Spanish male actors